Kharagpur College, established in 1949, is one of the Heritage Colleges in Paschim Medinipur. It offers Undergraduate & Postgraduate courses in Arts, Commerce and Science. It is affiliated to Vidyasagar University. Popularly known as Inda College.
This college has been re-accredited by NAAC Peer Team in the year 2016 and was awarded B++ in the second cycle of accreditation.

History
Kharagpur College was established on 29 August 1949 in the premises of the Silver Jubilee School at Kharagpur, Puratan Bazar.  Saleha Khatoon, wife of late Nasir Ali Khan of Panchberia, Kharagpur, donated the land for college construction and the construction was started under the dispersal scheme of the state government on 2 July 1951. The college later shifted its operation at the present permanent site at Inda, Kharagpur.

Departments

Arts

Science

Commerce
 Accountancy

Gallery

Accreditation
Kharagpur College has been  awarded a B++ grade by the National Assessment and Accreditation Council (NAAC). The college is also recognized by the University Grants Commission (UGC).

See also
Hijli College

References

External links
 
Vidyasagar University
University Grants Commission
National Assessment and Accreditation Council

Colleges affiliated to Vidyasagar University
Educational institutions established in 1949
Universities and colleges in Paschim Medinipur district
Kharagpur
1949 establishments in West Bengal